Thrill of the Chase is the fourth studio album by Norwegian record producer and DJ Kygo. It was released on 11 November 2022 through RCA Records. The album features guest appearances from James Gillespie, Zoe Wees, Dagny, X Ambassadors, R.I.Pablo, DNCE, Lukas Graham, Gryffin, Calum Scott, Sam Feldt, Emily Warren, Dean Lewis, Plested, and Stuart Crichton. Production was handled by Kygo, Gryffin, and Crichton themselves, as well as Robin Stjernberg, Petey Martin, Cirkut, David Stewart, Andrew Jackson, and Duck Blackwell. It serves as the follow-up to Kygo's previous album, Golden Hour (2020). Thrill of the Chase blends pop and dance music much like his previous releases.

Background
The album was released as a surprise with no prior announcement. However, Kygo hinted at a new album in an August 2022 interview with Audacy. The day before it was released, he announced that there would be a surprise coming at midnight, which would be the next day. On its release date, he explained the recording process of the album and shared his thoughts on it through a statement shared to EDM.com:Thrill Of The Chase is a collection of songs I worked on over the last two years that started during Covid and ended with sessions in Los Angeles. I've had the chance to play or tease the unreleased music throughout the year at shows and the feedback was unbelievable. A few of the songs on Thrill Of The Chase are different from anything I've ever made in the past and I'm really excited for everyone to finally hear the album in its entirety.

Singles
The lead single of the album, "Gone Are the Days", which features Scottish singer-songwriter James Gillespie, was released on 16 April 2021. The second single, "Love Me Now", which features German singer-songwriter Zoe Wees, was released on 13 August 2021. The third single, "Undeniable", which features American band X Ambassadors, was released on 15 October 2021. The fourth single, "Dancing Feet", which features American band DNCE, was released on 25 February 2022. The fifth single, "Freeze", was released on 6 May 2022. The sixth single, "Never Really Loved Me", a collaboration with Australian singer-songwriter Dean Lewis, was released on 1 July 2022. The seventh single, "Lost Without You", another collaboration with Lewis, was released on 8 July 2022. The eighth and final single, "Woke Up in Love", a collaboration with American record producer Gryffin and English singer-songwriter Calum Scott, was released on 9 September 2022.

Track listing

Notes
  signifies a co-producer

Personnel
Musicians

 Kygo – strings (1)
 James Gillespie – vocals (1)
 Sean Lascelles – strings (1)
 Zoe Wees – vocals (2); background vocals (2)
 Dagny – vocals (3)
 Sam Harris – vocals (4)
 Casey Harris – keyboards (4)
 Adam Levin – drums (4)
 Joe Jonas – vocals (6)
 Jack Lawless – drums (6)
 JinJoo Lee – guitar (6)
 Lukas Forchhammer – vocals (7)
 Calum Scott – vocals (8)
 Emily Warren – vocals (9)
 Dean Lewis – vocals (10, 12)
 Stuart Crichton – vocals (13)
 Andrew Jackson – vocals (14)

Technical

 Serban Ghenea – mixing
 Randy Merrill – mastering
 John Hanes – engineering (1–2, 4–6, 8–10, 13, 14)
 Andy Hall Hall – vocal production (1)
 Patrick Pyke Salmy – recording (2)
 Ricardo Muñoz – recording (2)
 Bryce Bordone – engineering assistance (2–5, 7–9, 11–13)
 Ryan Dulude – recording (4)
 David Stewart – vocal production (6)
 Sean Lascelles – additional studio production (6)
 Lorna Blackwood – vocal production (8)
 Daniel Mirza – vocal production (9)
 Alex Borel – vocal production (10, 12)
 Colin Foote – vocal production (10, 12)
 Patrick Gardner – recording (12)

Charts

References

2022 albums
Albums produced by Cirkut
Albums produced by Kygo
Kygo albums
RCA Records albums